Everything's Alright is the fourth album released by Canadian country music singer Charlie Major. The lead single, "I'm Feeling Kind of Lucky Tonight," was a #1 on RPM's country chart.

Track listing
All tracks written by Charlie Major, except "Thank the Lord for the Night Time", written by Neil Diamond.
 "I'm Feeling Kind of Lucky Tonight" - 3:42
 "Some Days Are Better" - 4:09
 "You Can Trust in My Love" - 3:33
 "Long, Long Gone" - 3:30
 "I Keep on Driving" - 3:53
 "Thank the Lord for the Night Time" - 3:31
 "Heaven Is…" - 4:10
 "St. Valentine's Day" - 4:03
 "Alone in the Night" - 4:05
 "Everything's Alright" - 3:02
 "Where Does the Time Go" - 3:56

Chart performance

References

External links
 [ allmusic.com]

Charlie Major albums
1997 albums